Exelastis rhynchosiae is a species of moth in the genus Exelastis, known from Arkansas and Florida in the United States. It is restricted to specific habitats with dry or well drained sandy soils such as pine flatwoods, pine-turkey oak sandhills, sandy open areas of high live oak hammocks, or sand pine-evergreen scrub on ancient dunes where the hostplants grow.

Adults are on wing from April to November, and have a wingspan of 12-18 millimetres. The forewings are grayish yellow with scattered pale yellow scales and the hindwings are uniformly dark gray brown with medium gray brown fringes and dark tufts.

The larvae feed on Rhynchosia cinerea and possibly Rhynchosia latifolia. They mainly feed on leaf shoots, buds, flowers, and immature seedpods, but mature leaves are occasionally skeletonized when tender growth is not available. Final instar larvae are about 10 mm long and light green to yellowish green.

References

Exelastini
Moths described in 1898